Pavel Nikolaevitch Podkolzin (born 15 January 1985) is a Russian former professional basketball player. Formerly, he played in the NBA and the NBA Development League.

Pro career
Podkolzin made his debut with Lokomotiv Novosibirsk, in the Russian second division, during the 2001–02 season. In December 2001, he signed with Italy's Metis Varese, for whom he played from 2002 to 2004. He was selected by the Utah Jazz in the 2004 NBA Draft and promptly traded to the Dallas Mavericks for a future first-round pick in the 2005 NBA Draft. He was originally available for selection in the previous year's draft, but withdrew due to acromegaly, a pituitary disorder. Podkolzin was considered to be a high draft pick in the 2004 draft because of his size, blocking ability and strength, but he was chosen late in the draft. Podkolzin averaged 6.0 rebounds in 14.0 minutes in his first two Las Vegas Summer League Revue games. On 5 August 2006 he was waived by the Mavericks after appearing briefly in just six games spanning two seasons.

In 2006–07, he played in the Russian Super League for Khimki BC and former team Lokomotiv Novosibirsk.

Russian national team
Podkolzin was a member of the junior Russian national basketball team that won the silver medal at the 2000 European Cadets Championship.

Notes

External links

Photo of Pavel Podkolzin, dated February 28, 2006

1985 births
Living people
BC Khimki players
BC Nizhny Novgorod players
Centers (basketball)
Dallas Mavericks players
Russian expatriate basketball people in Italy
Fort Worth Flyers players
National Basketball Association players from Russia
Pallacanestro Varese players
Russian expatriate basketball people in the United States
Russian men's basketball players
Sportspeople from Novosibirsk
Utah Jazz draft picks